Kosmos 869 ( meaning Cosmos 869) was an uncrewed military Soyuz 7K-S test. It was a somewhat successful mission. This was the third and final test flight of a new Soyuz spacecraft type 7K-S. It was designed to be a spaceship for military solo missions. At the time of the launch the program had already been discontinued. The completed spaceships were launched as uncrewed test flights: Kosmos 670, Kosmos 772 and Kosmos 869. The experience from these flights were used in the development of the successor program Soyuz spacecraft the Soyuz 7K-ST.

Mission parameters
Spacecraft: Soyuz 7K-S.
Mass: 6800 kg.
Crew: None.
Launched: November 29, 1976.
Landed: December 17, 1976 10:31 UTC.
Perigee: 209 km.
Apogee: 289 km.
Inclination: 51.7 deg.
Duration: 17.99 days.

Maneuver Summary
196 km X 290 km orbit to 187 km X 335 km orbit. Delta V: 15 m/s.
187 km X 335 km orbit to 259 km X 335 km orbit. Delta V: 21 m/s.
259 km X 335 km orbit to 260 km X 345 km orbit. Delta V: 2 m/s.
260 km X 345 km orbit to 265 km X 368 km orbit. Delta V: 7 m/s.
265 km X 368 km orbit to 267 km X 391 km orbit. Delta V: 6 m/s.
267 km X 391 km orbit to 300 km X 310 km orbit. Delta V: 32 m/s.

Total Delta V: 83 m/s.

See also

Soyuz 7K-OK
Soyuz TM-25
Cosmos 670
Cosmos 772

References

Kosmos 0869
Kosmos 0869
Kosmos 0869
1976 in the Soviet Union
Spacecraft launched in 1976
1976 in spaceflight